The 1908 Southwest Texas State football team  was an American football team that represented Southwest Texas State Normal School—now known cas Texas State University–as an independent during the 1908 college football season.  The team had no head coach and finished the season with a record of 0–2.

Schedule

Personnel
 Bailiff
 Barrow
 Bode, right tackle
 Buttrell, center
 Collins, left tackle
 Cowan, captain
 Tip Eaton, left guard
 Garland, left halfback
 Graham, substitute
 Hutto, right guard
 Chalmers Livsey, right end
 L. Livsey, left end
 Louden, right halfback
 Raborn
 Terrill, fullback
 Tinsey
 Olsen, manager

References

Southwest Texas State
Texas State Bobcats football seasons
College football winless seasons
Southwest Texas State Bobcats football